Miodrag Krivokapić may refer to:

 Miodrag Krivokapić (actor) (born 1949), Serbian actor 
 Miodrag Krivokapić (footballer) (born 1959), Montenegrin former footballer